Kwantlen First Nation is a First Nations band government in British Columbia, Canada, located primarily on McMillan Island near Fort Langley. The Kwantlen people traditionally speak hən̓q̓əmin̓əm̓, the Downriver dialect of Halkomelem, one of the Salishan family of languages.

The Kwantlen are a Stó:lō people (an ethnicity which includes the nearby Katzie and Kwikwetlem First Nations among many others throughout British Columbia's Lower Mainland region), though as of June 2018, Kwantlen withdrew from the Sto:lo Tribal Council and currently operates as an independent Nation.

History
The events and shape of Kwantlen history and culture pre and post-contact is inseparable from that of the Sto:lo people as a whole. Prior to European contact, the Kwantlen were one of the most populous First Nations of the Lower Fraser and the leading faction of the Sto:lo people. Kwantlen occupied many significant village sites throughout their territory, including settlements in current day New Westminster, Surrey, Langley, Maple Ridge, and Mission. According to anthropologist Charles Hill-Tout, the main village of the Kwantlen people was sχəyəməɬ in what is now known as New Westminster. Directly across the River on the Surrey side was the Summer fishing village known as qəqəyt. Another key area of Kwantlen territory is the Stave River valley that was and continues to be important for hunting, trapping, cedar bark stripping, fishing, and other cultural uses.

After European contact, the Kwantlen moved their main settlement upriver from New Westminster to Fort Langley. The Hudson's Bay Company had established the trading post in 1829. The Kwantlen defensively sought to control and maintain a trading advantage with the HBC in Fort Langley. The importance of the Kwantlen to the British settlement at Fort Langley became evident when Hudson's Bay Company men at the Fort joined Kwantlen warriors in repelling an attack by the Euclataws of Quadra Island - the victory of combined Kwantlen and British forces helped bring an end to slave raids on the lower Fraser by northern tribes, and is the only time British and Indigenous forces fought side by side in British Columbia. Kwantlen lost power after the formation of the colony of British Columbia. Their power was diminished further after British Columbia joined Canada, and the colonizing government took control and assigned their affairs to the administration of an Indian Agent  This agent was appointed by the government in Ottawa.

Origin of the name

In early European records, the Kwantlen people are referred to as the Quoitlen, Quaitlines, and other variations on these spellings. In the late-1800s the Kwantlen First Nation became known to non-Natives as the "Langley Indian Band", a name which became official, and was used by the Canadian Federal Department of Indian Affairs until 1994. In June 1994, former Chief Marilyn Gabriel reclaimed the traditional name of Kwantlen for her people and community which was marked by a traditional ceremony. Kwantlen Polytechnic University was granted permission to use the Kwantlen Name by the late Sto:lo Grand Chief Joe Gabriel. The name "Kwantlen" means "Tireless Runner" in the Halkomelem language.

Modern day
The Kwantlen First Nation is a progressive community administered by the hereditary chief and council and advised by the decisions of a formal Elders Advisory Committee that meets once a month. With this guidance, the community has seen a cultural resurgence and robust economic growth. Some examples of this cultural resurgence include the opening of a new Cultural Centre, a renewed focus on learning Halkomelem, and the annual First Salmon Ceremony. Kwantlen is Operational under the First Nations Land Management Act  which through the Kwantlen Land Code, enables Kwantlen to opt-out of 34 Sections of the Indian Act related to the management of reserve lands.

The band owns a number of business entities. These entities are:

 Seyem' Qwantlen Business Management Ltd 
 Seyem' Qwantlen Construction Ltd.
 Seyem' Qwantlen Construction Limited Partnership
 Seyem' Qwantlen Development Ltd.
 Seyem' Qwantlen Development Limited Partnership 
 Seyem' Qwantlen Resources Ltd.
 Seyem' Qwantlen Resources Limited Partnership
 Seyem' Qwantlen Ventures Limited Partnership
 Seyem' Qwantlen Ventures Ltd.
 Lelem Hospitality Limited Partnership
 Lelem Hospitality Ltd.
 Seyem' Qwantlen Harbour Authority 
 Kwantlen Lands, Resources and Stewardship Ltd.
 Seyem' Qwantlen Housing Society

In addition to these business ventures, Seyem' Qwantlen is also involved in a number of heritage and stewardship activities which are designed to improve local fisheries, wildlife and habitat, and bring awareness to the wider non-Native community of the Kwantlen People and their rich culture.

Territory

The band administers six Indian Reserves:
Langley Indian Reserve No. 2, on right (west) bank of the Stave River, 1 mile from its confluence with the Fraser River, 58.3 ha.  This and IRs Nos. 3 and 4 are located in the District of Mission
Langley Indian Reserve No. 3, on island at the mouth of the Stave River, 46 ha.
Langley Indian Reserve No. 4, on the left (east) bank of the mouth of the Stave River, adjacent to Silvermere Lake, 96 ha.
Langley Indian Reserve No. 5, on the right (north) bank of the Fraser River, 2 miles northeast of Fort Langley, to the east of Albion, 140.6 ha.
Whonnock Indian Reserve No. 1, between Whonnock (W) and Ruskin (E), 34.4 ha.
McMillan Island Indian Reserve No. 6, on McMillan Island at Fort Langley, 181 ha., which is the main community of the band and also the location of its offices.

The band also shares the Peckquaylis Indian Reserve with 20 other bands.  It is the former St. Mary's Indian Residential School just east of Mission and is now a cultural, government, and aboriginal business centre.

Kwantlen First Nation traditional territory is located in Metropolitan Vancouver and includes land in: Langley, Maple Ridge, Pitt Meadows, Mission, Abbotsford, Surrey, New Westminster, Burnaby, Coquitlam, Richmond, Port Coquitlam, Delta, and Vancouver. The Nation has ceded no territory and does not engage in negotiations over territorial sovereignty.

Population

The band's registered population is 375. 69 band members live on reserve, the majority on the main reserve on McMillan Island.

References

External links
 Kwantlen First Nationaadnc.gc.ca/fnp/Main/Search/FNMain.aspx?BAND_NUMBER=564&lang=eng INAC Profile: Kwantlen First Nation]

Further reading
Kwantlen people had many ties to the land, Al Irwin, Langley Times, February 20, 2009
Hereditary Band Leadership Challenged, Wendy Stueck, The Globe and Mail, March 19, 2019 
 Canada’s Hollow Concern for First Nations Democracy, Robert Jago, The Walrus, February 21, 2019

 

Sto:lo governments
First Nations governments in the Lower Mainland